Prunus spinosissima, the thorny almond, is a species of wild almond native to dry areas of Central Asia, Afghanistan, and Iran, preferring to grow at 400-1500m above sea level. It is morphologically similar to Prunus erioclada, P. lycioides, P. eburnea and P. brahuica.

Description
Prunus spinosissima is a shrub reaching 2m. The bark is brownish-red, turning ash grey with age. The flowers are pink.

References

spinosissima
Flora of Central Asia
Flora of Afghanistan
Flora of Iran
Plants described in 1883
Taxa named by Alexander von Bunge